José Asunción Silva (27 November 1865 in Bogotá – 23 May 1896 in Bogotá) was a Colombian poet. He is considered one of the founders of Latin American Modernismo.

Life
Born to a wealthy and educated Bogotá family, Asunción Silva led a comfortable life. When he was just ten years old, he wrote his first poems. In 1882 he traveled through England, Switzerland and France, and in Paris met with other contemporary poets and artists, including Stéphane Mallarmé and Gustave Moreau. His trip to Europe would influence his style, as he incorporated many French themes. However, with the death of his father and the mounting financial difficulties of his family, Asunción Silva found himself obligated to return to Colombia. Incapable of paying his family's enormous debts, Silva accepted a diplomatic post in Caracas. Once there, he was encouraged by his fellow writers to dedicate himself to his poetry. In 1892, his beloved sister Elvira died. In 1895, many of Silva's works, including his principal work of prose, were lost in a shipwreck. He was, however, persuaded to recreate one of the novels from memory, but the losses of his sister and the novel took their toll nonetheless. It is said that Silva died by suicide after a dinner party on the evening of 23 May 1896.

Death
On the morning of 24 May 1896, a housemaid found Asunción Silva dead in his bed with a gun near his body; he had shot himself in the heart the night before. There are many reasons for his suicide, including the death of his sister Elvira, the loss of almost all his work when his ship sank near a quay in the Caribbean sea, and his debts. Prior to his death, he asked his doctor confidentially to mark the exact location of his heart.

He was buried in the Central Cemetery in Bogotá. Perhaps his more important legacy is the house where he lived, which has been converted into a museum, the Silva Poetry House.

Works

There has been a great deal of debate as to whether Silva was a precursor of Modernism or a fully Modernist poet, but Silva scholars like Rafael Maya and Maria Mercedes Carranza conclude that he is indeed a “fully matured” Modernist. In fact, Carranza praises Silva's influence on Modernist poetry stating that: "One of the remarkable contributions of Silva's poetry is the experimentation and rehabilitation of traditional meters, as he varied rhythms and accents, and played with stanzas and measures, with the aim of loosening up the rigidity of the verse, putting it at the service of the modulation, music, feelings and emotions he wanted to express. Among his great successes is the revival and rejuvenation the use of the enneasyllable, a success that is often unfairly awarded Ruben Dario".Some of his work, such as the anthology Bitter Drops (Gotas Amargas) has been praised for its use of language and irreverent, rebellious use of everyday language, the skeptical, "bitterly" humorous nature of its content and its break with literary and social tradition.

The poem "Nocturno" (Nocturnal) was his most famous work, published posthumously in 1908. Written in free verse, the poem broke with the more classical mode of Spanish versification and showed many signs of Modernism. The poem itself is written in a response to the death of Asunción Silva's sister, Elvira. The imagery, especially the symbolism of the shadow, evokes a sense of melancholy and sadness. Asunción Silva's face appears on the 5000 Colombian peso bill, and the entire "Nocturno" poem appears on microtext font on the bill.
 El libro de versos (published posthumously in 1923)
 De sobremesa (published in 1925; trans. In After-Dinner Conversation)

See also
 Guillermo Valencia

References

External links
 
 

1865 births
1896 deaths
19th-century Colombian poets
Colombian male poets
Burials at Central Cemetery of Bogotá
19th-century male writers
Suicides by firearm in Colombia
1890s suicides